Setacera pilicornis is a species of shore flies in the family Ephydridae.

Distribution
United States, Mexico.

References

Ephydridae
Insects described in 1902
Diptera of North America
Taxa named by Daniel William Coquillett